Prancer is a 1989 Christmas fantasy drama film directed by John Hancock, written by Greg Taylor, and starring Rebecca Harrell, Sam Elliott, Cloris Leachman, Abe Vigoda, Michael Constantine, Rutanya Alda, John Joseph Duda, and Ariana Richards. It is set in Three Oaks, Michigan, where town exteriors were filmed. Filming also occurred at the Old Republic House in New Carlisle, Indiana, La Porte, Indiana, and at Starved Rock State Park in Utica, Illinois.

The film was followed by a direct-to-video sequel, Prancer Returns, released by USA Home Entertainment in 2001.

Plot
Eight-year-old Jessica Riggs and her older brother, Steve, are being raised by their widowed father, the grieving and cantankerous John. Their apple farm has fallen on hard times. John is temporarily being helped by his sister-in-law, Sarah.

While walking home after a school Christmas pageant, Jessica and her best friend, Carol, witness a plastic reindeer fall from a Christmas decoration hung above the main street in town. She concludes that it was Prancer from the order given in the poem A Visit from St. Nicholas (a.k.a. The Night Before Christmas).

Afraid he will be unable to provide for Jessica, John discusses a plan for Sarah to take her in to raise temporarily. She overhears this, but initially does not know the full details. She and Carol go sledding and knock down some flowers at a house owned by a reclusive widow named Mrs. McFarland. While walking home, Jessica encounters a live reindeer in the woods. It runs away, disappearing into the darkness. Later, while walking home from school, she finds its tracks and follows them into the woods once more. She hears a gunshot, and continues to walk. John eventually finds her, but almost hits the reindeer who is now standing in the road. Noticing it is wounded, he grabs his rifle, intending to shoot it. As Jessica pleads for him not to do so, it disappears.

Later while dreaming of Prancer, Jessica is startled awake by the scene of the plastic reindeer falling from earlier. She hears a noise and sees that the window to the barn is open. Investigating, she finds the reindeer is now inside among the other animals. Afraid John will find him, she moves him to a shed. Certain that he is the "real" Prancer, she takes it upon herself to nurse him back to health. She calls veterinarian Dr. Orel Benton who initially refuses, but comes over to find him.

Jessica later tells a mall Santa that she has Prancer, and gives him a Polaroid picture and a letter to give to the real Santa before Christmas Eve. He takes them to the editor of the local newspaper. Jessica shows Prancer to Carol, and Steve walks in the barn as well. Jessica makes both of them promise not to tell anyone. Eventually, Jessica apologizes to Mrs. McFarland for knocking down her flowers, and asks her if she can have a job to help pay for oats for the reindeer. Mrs. McFarland agrees to pay her if she cleans a room in her house, and they become friends. The newspaper editor, inspired by Jessica's faith, writes an article which is then read by the local pastor in the middle of his sermon. Jessica, who attended the sermon with Steve, finds out she has been outed to the entire town. She becomes mad at Carol, who she thinks squealed. She later finds the article in the paper.

John, meanwhile, is reading the paper. Before he finds the article, he discovers Prancer has escaped from the barn and let all the other animals out too. While he tries to round them up, Prancer goes inside the house and wrecks it. Townspeople begin to converge on the farm, wanting to see him. John grabs his rifle, threatening to shoot him when a local butcher stops him, offering to buy Prancer. The butcher keeps him as a sales tool for his Christmas tree lot. Jessica, afraid the butcher will kill him, runs away in the snowy night determined to rescue him. Steve runs after her, telling her he loves her even though he doesn't understand her sometimes. Hearing how Jessica feels, Steve decides to help her free Prancer. He tries to break open the lock, while Jessica gets the idea to climb to the top of Prancer's cage and let him fly out from the top. Steve is worried for her safety and yells at her to get down. She attempts to open the cage but falls, injuring her head in the process.

Jessica stays in her bedroom, becoming despondent. John goes to her and she asks him to read a passage from "Yes, Virginia, there is a Santa Claus". He tells her that times may continue to be hard for a long time but while he could bear losing the farm, it would absolutely kill him to lose her. He changes his mind about sending her away to Sarah. He suggests they take Prancer to Antler Ridge, which would be the perfect place for Santa to pick him up. The townspeople gather outside her bedroom window and begin singing to cheer her up. Prancer is taken to Antler Ridge where he runs out of sight. Following his tracks, John and Jessica notice that they vanish at the edge of a cliff. The faint sound of sleigh bells can be heard, and a streak of light is seen rising to meet Santa's sleigh. Jessica bids Prancer farewell, and to always remember her. The sleigh flies across the full moon and over the town toward the Riggs farm—its very first stop.

Cast

 Rebecca Harrell as Jessica Riggs
 Sam Elliott as John Riggs
 John Joseph Duda as Steve Riggs
 Cloris Leachman as Mrs. McFarland
 Abe Vigoda as Dr. Orel Benton
 Michael Constantine as Mr. Stewart/Mall Santa
 Rutanya Alda as Sarah
 Ariana Richards as Carol Wetherby
 Johnny Galecki as Billy Quinn
 Mark Rolston as Herb Drier
 Walter Charles as Minister
 Michael Luciano as Bert
 Jesse Bradford as Boy #1
 Sandra Olson as Town woman
 Dan Atherton as Town man
 Boo as Prancer

Release

Critical reception
The film received mixed to positive reviews from critics. It holds a 65% rating on Rotten Tomatoes based on 23 reviews, with an average rating of 6.1/10. The critical consensus reads, "Prancer's good-natured holiday cheer -- and a terrific performance from its young star -- are enough to make this yuletide adventure a moderately rewarding watch".

The film's young lead actress, Rebecca Harrell, garnered a nomination for a Young Artist Award for Best Young Actress Starring in a Motion Picture for her performance, but lost to Winona Ryder for her role in Great Balls of Fire!. Movie critic Roger Ebert highlighted Harrell's performance, saying:

And what really redeems the movie, taking it out of the category of kiddie picture and giving it a heart and gumption, is the performance by a young actress named Rebecca Harrell, as Jessica. She's something. She has a troublemaker's look in her eye, and a round, pixie face that's filled with mischief. And she's smart -- a plucky schemer who figures out things for herself and isn't afraid to act on her convictions.

Home media
The film was released on DVD by MGM Home Video with several re-packagings in 2003 and 2004, and a newer release on October 7, 2014.

Reindeer 
The reindeer used for Prancer was a pregnant female reindeer named Boo. Pregnant reindeer keep their antlers for longer, and she was needed so she wouldn't shed before filming was over.

See also
 List of Christmas films
 Santa Claus's reindeer

References

External links
 
 
 
 

1980s Christmas drama films
1980s Christmas films
1980s fantasy drama films
1989 drama films
1989 films
Alliance Atlantis films
American Christmas films
American fantasy drama films
Canadian Christmas films
Canadian fantasy drama films
English-language Canadian films
Films about children
Films about deer and moose
Films about father–daughter relationships
Films directed by John D. Hancock
Films produced by Raffaella De Laurentiis
Films set in Indiana
Films set in Michigan
Films scored by Maurice Jarre
Films shot in Illinois
Films shot in Indiana
Films shot in Michigan
Orion Pictures films
Santa Claus's reindeer
1980s English-language films
1980s American films
1980s Canadian films